Yoo Seung-woo, also stylised Yu Seung Woo (born February 26, 1997), is a South Korean singer-songwriter and guitarist. He is signed to Starship Entertainment's subsidiary label Highline Entertainment.

Career

2012-2014: Superstar K4 and debut 
In 2012, Yoo Seung-woo made his television debut when he competed in Mnet's Superstar K4, where he finished in the top six. 

On May 3, 2013, he released his music video to "Hello," the title track of his first mini album, The First Picnic. He released The First Picnic on May 8, 2013. One year later, he released the music video for "Hesitating Lips" the title track of his second album Already 19 on February 9, 2014.

2015-present: Starship Entertainment 
In January 2015, Yoo collaborated with hip-hop artist Mad Clown, which attracted attention for its mixing of hip-hop and acoustic music. In February, Yoo signed to Starship Entertainment's acoustic sublabel, "Starship Y".

In September 2020, Starship announced that Yoo had moved to a different subsidiary label when renewing his contract, moving from Starship Y to Highline Entertainment.

Discography

Studio albums

Extended plays

Singles

As lead artist

As featured artist

Collaborations

Filmography

Theater

Awards

References

External links

1997 births
Living people
K-pop singers
South Korean pop rock singers
South Korean pop guitarists
South Korean folk rock singers
Superstar K participants
Starship Entertainment artists
21st-century South Korean male  singers
21st-century guitarists
South Korean male singer-songwriters
South_Korean_male_idols